Hillevi Martinpelto (born 9 January 1958 in Älvdalen) is a Swedish lyric soprano. She made her debut in Madama Butterfly by Giacomo Puccini in 1987. She is best known for her work with John Eliot Gardiner and the Monteverdi Choir. With Gardiner, she recorded Weber's Oberon and Mozart's Le nozze di Figaro and Idomeneo, to considerable acclaim.

In the summer of 2014 Martinpelto performed at Stålboga Summer Opera.

Martinpelto's father is Finnish.

Awards
2006: appointed Hovsångerska by H.M. the King of Sweden

References 

1958 births
Living people
Swedish operatic sopranos
Swedish people of Finnish descent
Litteris et Artibus recipients